Outer Dark is the third solo album by American composer Bill Laswell, released on December 4, 1994 by FAX +49-69/450464.

Track listing

Personnel 
Adapted from the Outer Dark liner notes.
Musicians
Bill Laswell – effects, producer
Technical personnel
Layng Martine – assistant engineer
Robert Musso – engineering, effects
Thi-Linh Le – photography

Release history

References

External links 
 Outer Dark at Bandcamp
 

1994 albums
Bill Laswell albums
FAX +49-69/450464 albums
Albums produced by Bill Laswell